Zaryn Dentzel (born 1983) is an American computer scientist and entrepreneur. He founded Tuenti in 2006. There was attempt to steal millions in Bitcoins in 2021. Dentzel was born in Santa Barbara, California in 1983. He moved to Spain in the 1990s.

References 

American computer scientists
21st-century American businesspeople
American emigrants to Spain
People from Santa Barbara, California
Businesspeople from California
1983 births
Living people